Štivor (Cyrillic: Штивoр) is a village near Prnjavor in Bosnia and Herzegovina. The settlement is almost exclusively inhabited by Italians whose origins are from the Sugana Valley (Italian-Valsugana) in present Trentino, a Northern Italian autonomous province.

History
In the early 1880s because of heavy rains, the Brenta River flooded, causing a catastrophe in the entire Sugana Valley, an important valley in the then Austrian province of Tyrol, in present-day Trentino. Infrastructures were heavyly damaged, and many families were made homeless. The flooding had negative effects on the valley’s economy and the whole area entered an era of economic depression that caused the loss of many jobs. In a time of limited opportunities, reconstruction resulted very difficult. Those who had lost their homes and jobs had to leave the area in order to survive. Emigration was a common phenomenon in those years; it became a valid alternative to remaining in the home region. The people in the Sugana Valley who had been hit hard by the flood  considered as first option to emigrate to Brazil, which has been home to a large Italian-Tyrolean community. Unfortunately, after selling all their assets to pay for their travel expenses, the villagers found out that the man in charge of travel arrangement had defrauded them, disappearing with the money. Unconfirmed sources suggest that the news of what happened to those hapless people reached the Austro-Hungarian Emperor Franz Joseph II, who - moved by compassion - offered to settle them in the newly acquired province of Bosnia-Herzegovina.

At the Congress of Berlin in 1878, the Austro-Hungarian Foreign Minister Gyula Andrássy obtained the occupation and administration of Bosnia and Herzegovina, a region which had previously belonged to the Ottoman Empire, a region that was home to Serbs, Croats and Bosniaks. Although the Province would not be formally incorporated into the Empire until 1908, the Imperial Government followed a policy of allowing loyal populations to settle there.  According to such policy, the new settlers would have supported imperial rule in case of civic unrest. Since present-day Trentino was at that time part of the Austro-Hungarian Empire, families from the Sugana Valley and from the villages of Primiero, Aldeno e Cimone were entitled to colonize land in Bosnia. After traveling for a month to reach they destinations, about 320 families arrived in Bosnia and settled mainly in the districts of Prnjavor and Banja Luka, while others settled in the Herzegovina districts of Konjica and Tuzla, although these last settlements would not last long. The families from the Sugana Valley settled in the village of Stivor toward the end of 1882 and soon integrated into their surroundings. After the dissolution of the Austro-Hungarian Empire in 1918, these ethnic Italians automatically became citizens of the newly created Kingdom of Yugoslavia. Before the start of World War II Yugoslavia and Italy negotiated an agreement concerning the status of Italians living in Yugoslavia. Accordingly, Italians living in the region were granted Italian citizenship if they had moved to Italy and lived there for at least a year. Many families took up the opportunity while many others opted to stay in Yugoslavia, like the Trentini in Stivor and Tuzla. (Some have argued that they were not properly informed about the deal by Yugoslav authorities, who were not anxious to acknowledge the presence of a large Italian community in the area, which was considered to be entirely Slav.) However, as late as 1921 there were 292 Italians living in the area.

After World War II

After the end of World War II farming remained the predominant economic activity in the area; in the mid-1960s the country's economy prospered considerably, and many inhabitants of Stivor moved to the Yugoslav industrial cities while others migrated abroad (most of them to Australia). When Tito’s Yugoslavia ended in 1991 and the war in Bosnia broke out, some of the Stivorians escaped abroad and many of them reached the Trentino, their ancestral home. Since then, around 530 Stivorians have re-settled in the Trentino and on March 9, 1997 the, ”Circolo Trentini di Štivor” or, “ Stivorian-Trentinis’ Club” was founded in Roncegno, in the Sugana Valley. Today around 270 people of the original Italian-Tyrolean community that arrived in 1882 are still living in Stivor, BIH. They speak their original Trentino dialect, while the Italian language is taught at the  local school, with a program supported by the Trentini nel Mondo Association. (unsourced)

References 
Frizzera Sandra, "Stivor. Odissea della speranza", Bergamo, Ed. Innocenti, 1976. 
Lorenzi Guido, "Stivor, ritorno a casa", Trento, Ed. Innocenti,1980. 
Rosalio Maria Rita, "Studi sul dialetto trentino di Stivor (Bosnia)", Firenze, La nuova Italia, 1979. 
Toso Fiorenzo, "Lingue d’Europa. La pluralità linguistica dei Paesi europei tra passato e presente", Milano, Baldini Castoldi Dalai, 2006. 
Zardo Umberto, "Stivor: contributo alla conoscenza di una comunità italiana in Bosnia", Udine, Ed. Il loggione, 1978 •Zieger Antonio, "Storia del Trentino Alto-Adige", Trento, Ed. Monauni, 1926.

External links 
 List of populated places in Bosnia and Herzegovina

Populated places in Bosnia and Herzegovina
Italian diaspora in Europe